Huỳnh Anh (born 16 October 1932) is a former Vietnamese cyclist. He competed in the team time trial at the 1964 Summer Olympics.

References

External links
 

1932 births
Living people
Vietnamese male cyclists
Olympic cyclists of Vietnam
Cyclists at the 1964 Summer Olympics
Place of birth missing (living people)